Hervé This (born 5 June 1955 in Suresnes, Hauts-de-Seine, sometimes named Hervé This-Benckhard, or Hervé This vo Kientza) is a French physical chemist who works for the Institut National de la Recherche Agronomique at AgroParisTech, in Paris, France. His main area of scientific research is molecular gastronomy, that is the science of culinary phenomena (more precisely, looking for the mechanisms of phenomena occurring during culinary transformations).

Career 
With the late Nicholas Kurti, he coined the scientific term "Molecular and Physical Gastronomy" in 1988, which he shortened to "Molecular Gastronomy" after Kurti's death in 1998. Graduated from ESPCI Paris, he obtained a Ph.D from the Pierre and Marie Curie University, under the title "La gastronomie moléculaire et physique". He has written many scientific publications, as well as several books on the subject, which can be understood even by those who have little or no knowledge of chemistry, but so far only four have been translated into English. He also collaborates with the magazine Pour la Science, the aim of which is to present scientific concepts to the general public. Member of the Académie d'agriculture de France since 2010, he is the president of the Section "Human Food" since 2011. In 2004, he was invited by the French Academy of sciences to create the Foundation "Food Science & Culture", of which he was appointed the Scientific Director. The same year, he was asked to create the Institute for Advanced Studies of Taste ("Hautes Etudes du Goût") with the University of Reims Champagne Ardenne, of which he is the President of the Educational Program. In 2011, he was elected as a Consulting Professor of AgroParisTech, and he was also asked to create courses on science and technology at Sciences Po Paris. 
The 3 June 2014, he created the "International Center for Molecular Gastronomy AgroParisTech-INRA," to which he was appointed director. The same day, he announced the creation of the Free Open International Journal of Molecular Gastronomy.

Some of his discoveries include "Chocolate Chantilly", a foam made of chocolate without eggs (and also cheese Chantilly, butter Chantilly, foie gras Chantilly...), new ways of cooking eggs, which he called "eggs at 6X°C" (around 65 °C, the white coagulates, but not the yolk), and more generally a large number of colloidal systems. He also found that beating an egg white after adding a small amount of cold water considerably increases the amount of foam produced. Every month he adds one new "invention" in the Art et Science section of the website of the chef Pierre Gagnaire.

Although his main focus is on physical chemistry, he also attributes great importance to the emotional aspect of cooking, as the title of one of his books shows: Cooking is love, art, technique.

Aside his scientific work, the latest "political" work by Hervé This has been the invention (in 1994) and the promotion of Note by Note cuisine - the next stage in the application of science to the kitchen after molecular cooking. Note by note cooking involves taking the molecules that compose ingredients used in cooking, and using these as the raw ingredients for making dishes. "If you use pure compounds, you open up billions and billions of new possibilities," Mr This said. "It's like a painter using primary colors or a musician composing note by note."

As part of the 2011 International Year of Chemistry, The French Embassy in Ireland in association with the Institut Français, the Alliance Française Dublin, the Lycée Français d’Irlande and the French Trade Commission UBIFRANCE put on a number of lectures around Dublin, Ireland where Hervé This performed demonstrations and promoted the new concept of 'note by note' cuisine.

Bibliography
 1993 : les Secrets de la casserole, Éditions Belin
 1995 : Révélations gastronomiques, Éditions Belin. 
 1997 : la Casserole des enfants, Éditions Belin
 2002 : Traité élémentaire de cuisine, Éditions Belin
 2002 : Casseroles et éprouvettes, Éditions Belin
 2005 : Molecular Gastronomy: Exploring the Science of Flavor (translator: Malcolm DeBevoise), Cambridge University Press. 
 2006 : La cuisine c'est de l'amour, de l'art, de la technique, Odile Jacob
 2007 : Construisons un repas, Odile Jacob
 2007 : De la science aux fourneaux, Pour la Science/Editions Belin
 2007 : Kitchen Mysteries: Revealing the Science of Cooking (translator: Jody Glading), Columbia University Press.  or 023114170X
 2007 : Alchimistes aux fourneaux, Flammarion
 2009 : Building a Meal: From Molecular Gastronomy to Culinary Constructivism (Arts and Traditions of the Table: Perspectives on Culinary History) (translator: Malcolm DeBevoise), Columbia University Press. 
 2009 : Cours de gastronomie moléculaire n°1 : Science, technologie, technique (culinaires) : quelles relations?, Quae/Belin, Paris.
 2011 : Cours de gastronomie moléculaire n°2 : Les Précisions culinaires, Quae/Belin, Paris.
 2012 : La cuisine note à note en douze questions souriantes, Belin, Paris.
 2014 : Note by Note Cooking, Columbia University Press, New York, USA.
 2014 : Mon histoire de cuisine, Belin, Paris.

References

External links
Hervé This blog
La gastronomie moléculaire Hervé This page at INRA 
Fondation Science & Culture Alimentaire 
Cours de gastronomie moléculaire 
Molecular Gastronomy Seminar with Hervé This

1955 births
French food scientists
Living people
Molecular gastronomy
People from Suresnes
French physical chemists
ESPCI Paris alumni